Menetou-Râtel is a commune in the Cher department in the Centre-Val de Loire region of France.

Geography
The commune is one of only a few that can grow grapes for Sancerre AOC wine.

Population

Sights
 The church of St. Martin, dating from the twelfth century.
 The fourteenth-century priory of Notre-Dame.
 The chateau of Couet built in 1875.
 A watermill.

See also
Communes of the Cher department

References

Communes of Cher (department)